The first and second lists are of all the permanent judges of the International Court of Justice, the main judicial organ of the United Nations, first chronologically and then by seat.  The third list is a list of judges appointed ad hoc by a party to a proceeding before the Court pursuant to Article 31 of the Statute of the International Court of Justice.

Permanent judges

Elections 
 2011 International Court of Justice judges election
 2014 International Court of Justice judges election
 2017 International Court of Justice judges election
 2018 International Court of Justice judges election
 2020 International Court of Justice judges election
 2021 International Court of Justice judges election
 2022 International Court of Justice judges election
 2023 International Court of Justice judges election

Succession of seats 

The Court comprises 15 seats. When the original fifteen judges were elected in 1946, they drew lots to determine which five would have 3-year initial terms, which five would have 6-year initial terms, and which five would have 9-year initial terms. From then onwards, all terms have been nine years, with five seats being up for election every three years. The seats are numbered according to the length of the initial term and then in order of seniority of the first judge to hold the seat.

There are no formal rules for the allocation of seats, other than that no two judges may be nationals of the same country. In practice, the five permanent members of the United Nations Security Council have each had a permanent seat on the Court, except between 1967 and 1985 when there was no Chinese judge and since 2018, when there has been no judge from the UK.  The remaining seats have been informally allocated by regional groups in the same way as the fifteen seats on the Security Council. Since 1970, the conventional allocation is three seats to Asia Pacific, three seats to Africa, two seats to Latin America and the Caribbean, two seats to Eastern Europe and five seats to Western Europe and Others. That convention was broken in 2018 when an Asian judge was elected to a seat previously occupied by judges from the Western Europe and Others group.

Judges sitting ad hoc

See also

List of International Court of Justice cases
Category:International Court of Justice judges

References

Lists of legal professionals
International Court of Justice
International Court of Justice judges